Shakne Epshtein (1883 in Iwye – 27 July 1945) was a Soviet journalist and the secretary and editor of the Jewish Anti-Fascist Committee (JAC)'s newspaper, Eynikayt (Unity). Solomon Mikhoels, the chairman of JAC and Epshtein approached Vyacheslav Molotov, the Soviet foreign minister, with an idea to establish Jewish autonomy in Crimea. Both ideas were rejected. Epshtein died in 1945.

References 

1883 births
1945 deaths
People from Iwye
People from Oshmyansky Uyezd
Belarusian Jews
Jewish socialists
Male journalists
Soviet journalists
Jewish anti-fascists
Soviet anti-fascists